George E. Mattson is a well-known author of martial arts books and the first American to be awarded a black belt in Uechi-Ryū Karate-do. He was the first to teach the style professionally resulting in the majority of the original growth in the United States of America. He was one of the first to publish a book in English about karate and has since continued to publish many books on Uechi-Ryu.

The 3 major, unique contributions documenting his style of karate 
Mattson has written several published books as well as e-book versions for electronic reading devices.  This includes the following: 
 The Way of Karate, Tuttle Publishing, 1958
 Uechiryu Karate Do : Classical Chinese Okinawan Self Defense, Peabody Publishing, 1974
 The Black Belt Test Guide, Peabody Publishing, 2008
 The Way of Uechi-ryu Karate, Peabody Publishing, 2010

Major Uechi-Ryū students of George Mattson 
 Campbell, Robert (10th degree black belt)
 Canna, Van  (10th degree black belt)
 Durkin, Buzz  (10th degree black belt)
 Maloney, James - Canada -  (10th degree black belt)
 Mattson, Walter - no relation - (10th degree black belt)
 Mattson, Chad - no relation - (10th degree black belt)
 Rabesa, Arthur  (10th degree black belt)
 Summers, Jack  (10th degree black belt)
 Blake, Windsong  (8th degree black belt)
 Deraney, George A.  (8th degree black belt)
 Finkelstein, David  (8th degree black belt)
 Glasheen, William  (8th degree black belt)
 Huff, Ed  (8th degree black belt)
 Mott, David   (8th degree black belt)
 Neide, Joan L.  (8th degree black belt)
 Wharton, Alton P. - Burmuda -   (8th degree black belt)
 Wilder, Clarence   (9th degree black belt)
 Witherell, Bruce  (9th degree black belt)
 Wong, Gary   (8th degree black belt)
 Yee, Darin   (8th degree black belt)
 Thom, Henry   (10th degree black belt)
 Tim Ford      (10th degree Black)          
He has sponsored an ongoing set of seminars by international karate masters including Okinawan Uechi-Ryu Karate-Do masters from Okinawa for over thirty years consecutively since 1983. Almost all of these have been in the United States of America except for the notable exception in 1985 which was held in Okinawa, Japan with virtual every Okinawan Uechi-Ryu Karate-Do master from Okinawa giving seminars and culminating in the participation in the annual All-Okinawa Karate-Do Kumite Championship with all styles of Okinawan Karate competing from all over the world each year.

George E. Mattson had been the chief instructor of a karate school in Boston at various location for decades. Many of his students upon mastery of Uechi-Ryu Karate-Do started successful karate schools in the Boston area and around Massachusetts and the New England area.  Many of them including George E. Mattson himself moved to Florida and started successful karate schools in Florida.  He currently teaches at his karate school in Mount Dora, Florida.

Early history 
Tomoyose Ryuko originally taught George E. Mattson as a young American serviceman for several hours in the evening after his duties on the military base in Okinawa only training occasionally at the Uechi-Ryu Karate-Do headquarters by Uechi Kanei and his other Master students. He was promoted to 1st degree black belt before leaving Okinawa at the end of his service in the military. Tomoyose Ryuko had studied previously with the founders of the other two major Okinawan Karate styles before starting lessons with Uechi Kanei finally. A few months before becoming too ill, Uechi Kanbun returned to Okinawa and taught at his son's karate school in Nago, Okinawa, Japan.  During that time, Tomoyose Ryuko studied with Kanbun Uechi and his students there. Tomoyose Ryuko therefore has the distinction of being one of the very few that was a student of all three founders of all three of the major styles of Okinawan Karate, Uechi Kanbun, Miyagi Chojun, and  Chibana Chosin.

George E. Mattson returned to Okinawa many times and arranged to travel with his students to Okinawa often. Through his continued travel to Okinawa and the seminars sponsored for Okinawan masters to travel to the USA George E. Mattson has been studying under the majority of Uechi-Ryu Karate-Do masters of the 20th century. As a result, he has been among the first to be promoted to each degree of black belt up to his current rank of 10th degree black belt in Uechi-Ryu Karate-Do in the USA.

References

Further reading 
 Bishop, Mark, Okinawan Karate, Tuttle: 1999
 Dollar, Alan, Secrets of Uechi Ryu and the Mysteries of Okinawa, Cherokee Publishing: 1996
 Joyner, Donald B., The Art and History of Uechi Ryu Karate-Do (A Study Guide for Uechi Ryu Karate-Do), (Paperback) January 1, 1996
 Joyner, Donald B., Uechi Ryu Karate-Do Student Guide and Handbook (A Study Guide for Uechi Ryu Karate-Do), February 1996
 Mattson, George E., The Way of Karate, Charles E. Tuttle Company: 1963.
 Mattson, George E., Uechiryu Karate Do (Classical Chinese Okinawan Self-Defense), Peabody Publishing Company: 1997 (8th printing).
 Mattson, George E.,  The Way of Uechi Ryu Karate, Peabody Publishing Company: 2010.
 Rymaruk, Ihor, Karate: A Master's Secrets of Uechi-ryu, Iron Arm International: 2004

External links 
 International Uechi-Ryū Karate Federation web site
 Uechi-Ryu site with much information on the style

Year of birth missing (living people)
Uechi-ryū practitioners
American male karateka
Living people